Jillian Parry (born January 31, 1982) is a former Miss Teen USA, having held the title for the year 2000, representing her home town of Newtown and state of Pennsylvania. She was the first titleholder from Pennsylvania to win the national competition.

Parry entered the Miss Pennsylvania Teen USA pageant on a whim, after a postcard was dropped in her mail, and won on her first attempt. Parry represented her state at the Miss Teen USA pageant televised live from Shreveport, Louisiana on August 26, 2000.

Parry won the pageant and was crowned Miss Teen USA 2000 based on her answer to the final interview question, and she came in first place in the evening gown competition.  She came in second behind Nicole O'Brian of Texas in the swimsuit competition.  She was crowned by Ashley Coleman of Delaware, Miss Teen USA 1999.

As Miss Teen USA, Parry represented the Miss Universe Organization. Her "sister" 2000 titleholders were Lynnette Cole (Miss USA, from Tennessee) and Lara Dutta (Miss Universe, of India). She passed her title on to her successor, Marissa Whitley of Missouri, on August 22, 2001.

She completed her Ph.D. in Public Health with a focus on Health Policy at the Johns Hopkins University in 2012 following a Master's in Public Health from the University of New Mexico in 2007 and a B.S. in Biobehavioral Health from Penn State University in 2004.  In June, 2006, Parry married Roderick Fry, a physical chemist from Kendall, New York.  They were married in Langhorne, Pennsylvania, in a Quaker ceremony.

Parry has been a vegan since 2002, and she is an active public health scientist in the field of environmental health policy.

References

External links
Miss Pennsylvania Teen USA official site
Miss Teen USA official site

Living people
Miss Teen USA winners
University of New Mexico alumni
Johns Hopkins University alumni
2000 beauty pageant contestants
20th-century Miss Teen USA delegates
People from Bucks County, Pennsylvania
1982 births
20th-century American people